William V. Lazor (born June 14, 1972) is an American football coach who is the senior offensive assistant for the Houston Texans of the National Football League (NFL). Lazor has previously served as the quarterbacks coach for the Washington Commanders, Seattle Seahawks, and Philadelphia Eagles. He is also the former  offensive coordinator of the Miami Dolphins, Cincinnati Bengals, and Chicago Bears. He played college football as a quarterback for Cornell University from 1991 to 1993.

Playing career
Lazor played football at Cornell before graduating in 1994. He was a three-year starting quarterback and graduated with 26 passing and total offensive program records.

Coaching career

Atlanta Falcons
Lazor entered the NFL coaching ranks in 2003 under head coach Dan Reeves as the Atlanta Falcons offensive quality control coach.

Washington Redskins
Lazor spent four seasons with the Washington Redskins, two of which were spent as the quarterbacks coach for head coach Joe Gibbs. During the 2004 and 2005 seasons, Lazor served as an offensive assistant.

Seattle Seahawks
Lazor coached quarterbacks for two seasons with the Seattle Seahawks under head coaches Mike Holmgren and Jim Mora.

University of Virginia
On January 28, 2010, Lazor was officially announced as the new offensive coordinator of the University of Virginia Cavaliers.

Philadelphia Eagles
On January 29, 2013, Lazor accepted a position with the Philadelphia Eagles as the quarterbacks coach, coaching alongside Chip Kelly.

Miami Dolphins
On January 15, 2014, Lazor was named offensive coordinator of the Miami Dolphins. He was fired on November 30, 2015.

Cincinnati Bengals
On January 18, 2016, Lazor was named quarterback coach for the Cincinnati Bengals, replacing recently promoted Ken Zampese.

On September 15, 2017, Lazor was named the Bengals offensive coordinator, taking the place of the recently fired Zampese. Lazor was promoted to full time offensive coordinator for the Bengals on January 3, 2018.

On January 11, 2019, Lazor was fired by the Bengals.

Chicago Bears
On January 16, 2020, Lazor was hired by the Chicago Bears as their offensive coordinator, replacing Mark Helfrich.

On November 13, 2020, head coach Matt Nagy relinquished play-calling duties to Lazor. The Bears offense noticeably improved, increasing from scoring an average of 19 points per game in the first 9 weeks of the season, compared to the 27 points per game in the latter 5 weeks where Lazor was in charge.

On April 2, 2021, head coach Matt Nagy announced during a press conference that he would resume calling plays in the 2021 season.

During the post game press conference after the week 4 win at home against the Detroit Lions, head coach Matt Nagy announced that he allowed Bill Lazor to act as the play caller following a highly criticized 26–6 loss on the road against the Cleveland Browns in week 3, In the same press conference, Nagy did not explicitly say that Lazor would continue calling plays alone going forward, rather Nagy continued to be vague regarding the future of the play calling.
He was let go by the Bears after the 2021 season.

Houston Texans
On February 24, 2023, Lazor was hired to be the Houston Texans Senior offensive assistant.

Personal life
Lazor earned his bachelor's degree in Human Development and Family Studies from Cornell in 1994. He is married to wife Nicole, with whom he has three kids, Nolan, Marin, and Charlotte.

References

External links
 Virginia Cavaliers bio

1972 births
Living people
American football quarterbacks
Atlanta Falcons coaches
Buffalo Bulls football coaches
Cincinnati Bengals players
Cornell Big Red football players
Cornell Big Red football coaches
Sportspeople from Scranton, Pennsylvania
Seattle Seahawks coaches
Virginia Cavaliers football coaches
Washington Redskins coaches
Miami Dolphins coaches
Players of American football from Pennsylvania
Philadelphia Eagles coaches
Cincinnati Bengals coaches
Chicago Bears coaches
National Football League offensive coordinators